This is a list of banks in Ukraine. According to the central bank of Ukraine there are 76 solvent licensed banks in Ukraine 14 of which designated by regulator as systemically important.

Central bank 
 National Bank of Ukraine

15 largest commercial banks 
In terms of total assets, as of January 1, 2018. Number of branches also as of January 1, 2018.

Other commercial banks 
 A-Bank
 Bank Lviv
 BTA Bank
 Credit Dnipro Bank
 Credit Europe Bank
 Creditwest Bank
 UTB Bank Ukraine
 Deutsche Bank
 First Investment Bank
 Idea Bank (99.5% ownership in Getin Holding S.A.)
 ING Bank Ukraine
 KredoBank (99.6% ownership in PKO Bank Polski)
 Marfin Bank
 Megabank
 Piraeus Bank
 Pravex Bank (subsidiary of Intesa Sanpaolo)
 ProCredit Bank
 SEB
 Tascombank
 Universal Bank
 VS Bank
 Concord bank (КОНКОРД банк)

Virtual banks 
Virtual bank (also often referred to as "Mobile bank", "Digital bank" or "neobank") in Ukraine is currently a type of bank that operates on the basis of a license from another (parental) bank. Such banks position themselves in the market as separate banking institutions with a different marketing and pricing policy, but from a legal standpoint, they continue to operate on behalf of the parent institution, so their financial condition remains completely dependent on the financial condition of the parent bank.

See also 

 Banking in Ukraine
 Ukrainian hryvnia
 Economy of Ukraine
 List of companies of Ukraine

References 

Ukraine

Banks
Ukraine